Lake Beloye (literally meaning White Lake) is a lake in the northwestern part of Vologda Oblast in Russia.

Lake Beloye may also refer to:

 Lake Beloye (Beshankovichy Raion), Belarus

In Russia:
 Lake Beloye (Chuvashia)
 Lake Beloye (Nizhny Novgorod Oblast)
 Lake Beloye (Ryazan Oblast)

See also
 White Lake (disambiguation)